Transfer entropy is a non-parametric statistic measuring the amount of directed (time-asymmetric) transfer of information between two random processes.

where H(X) is Shannon entropy of X. The above definition of transfer entropy has been extended by other types of entropy measures such as Rényi entropy.

Transfer entropy is conditional mutual information, with the history of the influenced variable  in the condition:

Transfer entropy reduces to Granger causality for vector auto-regressive processes. Hence, it is advantageous when the model assumption of Granger causality doesn't hold, for example, analysis of non-linear signals. However, it usually requires more samples for accurate estimation.
The probabilities in the entropy formula can be estimated using different approaches (binning, nearest neighbors) or, in order to reduce complexity, using a non-uniform embedding.
While it was originally defined for bivariate analysis, transfer entropy has been extended to multivariate forms, either conditioning on other potential source variables or considering transfer from a collection of sources, although these forms require more samples again.

Transfer entropy has been used for estimation of functional connectivity of neurons, social influence in social networks and statistical causality between armed conflict events.
Transfer entropy is a finite version of the  Directed Information which was defined in 1990 by James Massey as 
,  where  denotes the vector  and  denotes . The directed information places an important role in characterizing the fundamental limits (channel capacity) of communication channels with or without feedback  
 and gambling with causal side information.

See also 
 Conditional mutual information
 Causality
 Causality (physics)
 Structural equation modeling
 Rubin causal model
 Mutual information

References

External links 
  , a toolbox, developed in C++ and MATLAB, for computation of transfer entropy between spike trains.
  , a toolbox, developed in Java and usable in MATLAB, GNU Octave and Python, for computation of transfer entropy and related information-theoretic measures in both discrete and continuous-valued data.
  , a toolbox, developed in MATLAB, for computation of transfer entropy with different estimators.

Causality
Nonlinear time series analysis
Nonparametric statistics
Entropy and information